En busca del paraíso (English title: In search of paradise) is a Mexican telenovela produced by Ernesto Alonso for the broadband Televisa in 1982. It starred by Maricruz Olivier, Victoria Ruffo, Juan Luis Galiardo, David Reynoso, Miguel Angel Ferriz and Carlos Bracho.

Cast 
Maricruz Olivier as Patricia
Victoria Ruffo as Grisel
Juan Luis Galiardo as Gustavo
David Reynoso as Antonio
Miguel Angel Ferriz as Alberto
Carlos Bracho as José Luis
Yolanda Ciani as Rosaura
Susana Alexander as Sofia
Laura Flores as Yolanda
Lili Garza as Josefina
Nubia Martí as Jessica
Agustín Sauret as Enrique
Anita Blanch as Pachita #1
Lucha Altamirano as Pachita #2
Amparo Arozamena as Hortensia
Francisco Avendaño as Carlos
Martha de Castro as Elisa
Vicky de la Piedra as Violeta
Alejandro Ruiz
Jacqueline Andere

References

External links 

1982 telenovelas
Mexican telenovelas
1982 Mexican television series debuts
1983 Mexican television series endings
Spanish-language telenovelas
Television shows set in Mexico
Televisa telenovelas